ICONICS is an industrial automation provider. ICONICS software is used by many industries such as Automotive, Transportation, Building Control, Security, Food, Pharmaceutical, Machine Building, Oil, Gas, Petrochemical, Water and Wastewater, Renewable Energy and Manufacturing.

History
Founded in 1986, headquartered in Foxborough, Massachusetts near Boston, MA, the company has offices worldwide, including Australia, Canada, China, France, Germany, India, Middle East, Netherlands, Singapore and United Kingdom. ICONICS also has joint software development and sales offices in the Czech Republic and Italy. ICONICS is a Microsoft Gold Certified Partner whose products are tied closely to Microsoft operating systems. The company's first offerings were integrated with DOS, then evolved with the emergence of Microsoft Windows (including 3.1, NT, CE, 2000 and XP).

In 2011, ICONICS signed a global partnership agreement with Mitsubishi Electric to develop integrated software for the Process Automation and Social Infrastructure global markets, with Mitsubishi Electric contributing a 19.9% equity investment in ICONICS.

ICONICS is a charter member of the OPC Foundation, an organization responsible for maintaining the standards for automation connectivity. Russ Agrusa, ICONICS founder, has been a member of the OPC Foundation Board of Directors since 2003.

Worldwide applications
ICONICS software is used by companies throughout the world including:

Transneft Russian Pipeline 
London Heathrow Terminal 5
Loudoun Water
The Pentagon
University of Virginia
Microsoft Redmond Campus

Other companies using ICONICS software for their industrial automation applications include the Rome Metro, Deutsche Bahn, Mohegan Sun Casino, The Federation Tower, Schiphol Airport, Phoenix Sky Harbor International Airport and Poste Italiane.

References

Companies based in Massachusetts
Automation organizations